The effects of Hurricane Floyd in New England stretched across the region from Connecticut to Maine and included two casualties. Floyd, once a large and powerful hurricane, made landfall in North Carolina and weakened as it tracked northward along the U.S. East Coast. By September 17, 1999, the storm, downgraded in strength to a tropical storm, was situated over New England. It produced heavy rainfall and gusty winds throughout the entire region, leading to widespread downing of trees and extensive power outages before it moved away later that day. In Danbury, Connecticut, Floyd triggered severe flooding, considered the worst in 40 years, that damaged hundreds of homes. Damage totaled $4.819 million.

Background

The system moved west-northwestward, and intensified into a tropical storm on September 8. Continuing to intensify, Floyd attained hurricane strength on September 10. The hurricane ultimately peaked as a Category 4 hurricane on the Saffir–Simpson Hurricane Scale as it struck the Bahamas. The storm turned northwestward and soon northward, brushing the coast of Florida and the southeast United States. On September 16, Floyd made landfall as a Category 2 hurricane in North Carolina, and moved northeastward along the Eastern Seaboard. It passed through the Mid-Atlantic States as it deteriorated into a tropical storm, and lost its tropical identity over southern Maine.

Preparations
On September 15, an existing tropical storm watch was extended northward to the Merrimack River in Massachusetts. The next day, a tropical storm warning was extended northward to Plymouth, Massachusetts, but was soon replaced by a hurricane warning. The watch stretching to the Merrimack River was then replaced by a warning. By 0900 UTC on September 17, all tropical cyclone advisories were lifted. In Connecticut, utility companies readied supplies and emergency crews in advance of the hurricane. In Massachusetts and Rhode Island, with the anticipation of heavy rains, the United States Geological Survey (USGS) prepared to send eight teams into the field to take measurements along 30 rivers. Rhode Island Governor Lincoln Almond advised residents to prepare for the storm's onslaught. The storm disrupted many residents' travel plans in the state, while people evacuated from certain coastal communities. The threat of Hurricane Floyd forced schools, malls, and the University of Massachusetts Amherst to close.

Impact

Southern New England
In Connecticut, the storm caused one casualty: a man drowned after boating in the swollen Quinnipiac River. The storm caused extensive flooding and serious damage. Wind gusts exceeding , combined with the saturated ground, brought down many trees and triggered severe power outages in the area. As Floyd tracked up the Connecticut River Valley towards Massachusetts, it dropped heavy precipitation. The heaviest rainfall occurred in a southwest–northeast orientated swath from northern New Jersey to southwestern Connecticut, including southeastern New York. At the Danbury Airport,  of rain was reported. Numerous rivers overflowed; for example, the Still River and its tributaries triggered severe flooding. The worst of the flooding—considered the worst in 40 years—took place at Danbury. Hundreds of homes, two car dealerships, several roads, and other structures were damaged there. At Greentree Motors, all 200 vehicles were declared a total loss. However, throughout the state, roads were closed and basements were inundated. The flooding inflicted at least $1.3 million in monetary damage within Fairfield County. Portions of the state were declared a federal disaster area.

Floyd brought intense winds and heavy rain to Rhode Island. The strongest winds were confined to Washington and Providence counties. The winds brought down numerous trees, tree limbs and power lines. The Pawtuxet River reached flood stage on September 16, and crested the next day. Although it surpassed its banks, no flood damage was reported. The storm's effects in the state were mostly minor.

The strongest winds were concentrated over two sections of the state—the western mountains terrain and Cape Cod. The winds brought down trees and power lines in these areas, particularly around Pittsfield. In terms of rainfall, the storm dropped  in many locations. The heavy precipitation caused rivers to swell, and in some cases flow over their banks. Storm surge at the Fox Point Hurricane Barrier reached .

Northern New England
By September 17, Floyd was located over southwestern Maine, dropping heavy rains. The entire state received precipitation, with the highest totals confined to southern areas. The National Weather Service issued a flood watch for two-thirds of the state. The storm was described as "tame", and damage was generally minor. In much of Androscoggin County, rainfall amounted to between 7 and 8 in (180 and 200 mm); Poland reported . Several rivers approached or exceeded flood stage due to rainfall from Floyd and Hurricane Dennis less than a week earlier, causing minor flooding. Floyd helped to alleviate drought conditions in Maine. Some roads in susceptible areas were submerged, and a few basements were flooded. Wind gusts of  blew down trees and snapped branches, especially in the area surrounding Baxter State Park. Around 15,000 residents were affected by power outages as a result.  Following the event, five counties—Androscoggin, Cumberland, Kennebec Oxford, and Somerset—were declared disaster areas, making federal aid available to those areas.

At Mount Washington,  of precipitation fell. Along the Saco and Pemigewasset rivers, minor flooding took place, though only in low-lying terrain. Strong winds also impacted the state, with gusts often exceeding . The winds brought down several small trees in Jaffrey, and triggered power outages that affected 10,000 residents. A federal disaster area was declared in the state.

In Vermont, for the first time in years, the Tunbridge World's Fair was canceled due to the storm. One woman sustained injuries after a tree crashed on her vehicle. Floyd produced high winds and heavy rain throughout the state, leading to widespread downed trees and powerlines. Thousands of residents in the state lost power after  winds impacted the area. The rainfall was offset by persistent drought conditions, however. Numerous tributaries overflowed their banks, and significant flooding was reported. In Weathersfield, part of U.S. Route 5 was washed away. Some schools were closed and events canceled in the region. The downed trees caused structural damage, blocked roadways, and affected hiking trails. The high winds also damaged buildings and some apple orchards, Waves of  occurred on Lake Champlain, damaging numerous watercraft along the shore. The hurricane caused one death. Most of Vermont was declared a disaster area after the storm.

See also

List of New England hurricanes

References

External links
Floyd Tropical Cyclone Report 

Floyd Effects
New England
1999 natural disasters
1999 natural disasters in the United States
Floyd Effects
Floyd Effects
Floyd Effects
Floyd Effects
Floyd Effects
Floyd Effects
Floyd